Avianova may refer to:

 Avianova (Italy), a defunct Italian airline
 Avianova (Russia), a defunct Russian airline